The 1976–77 Weber State Wildcats men's basketball team represented Weber State College during the 1976–77 NCAA Division I basketball season. Members of the Big Sky Conference, the Wildcats were led by second-year head coach Neil McCarthy and played their home games on campus at Wildcat Gym in Ogden, Utah.

Weber State was second in the regular season standings and qualified for the four-team conference tournament, hosted by Idaho State in Pocatello. The Wildcats won their semifinal by a point over underdog  and advanced to the final again, this time to host Idaho State; the teams had split the season series with home wins. The trend continued as Idaho State won the tournament final at home by six points. They advanced to the NCAA Tournament's Elite Eight, upsetting #2 UCLA in the Sweet Sixteen. It remains the best-ever showing in the NCAA tournament by a Big Sky team.

Forward Stan Mayhew was named to the all-conference team, center Jim Erickson was on the second team, and freshman guard Mark Mattos was honorable mention.

Weber State appeared in the first five finals of the conference tournament, and won the next three (1978, 1979, 1980).

This was the last season in Wildcat Gym (now Swenson Gym); the new Dee Events Center opened in November 1977.

Postseason results

|-
!colspan=6 style=| Big Sky tournament

References

External links
Sports Reference – Weber State Wildcats: 1976–77 basketball season

Weber State Wildcats men's basketball seasons
Weber State